Bruny Surin  (born July 12, 1967) is a Canadian former track and field athlete, winner of a gold medal in the 4×100 metres relay at the 1996 Summer Olympics. In 2008 he was inducted into Canada's Sports Hall of Fame as part of the 1996 Summer Olympics 4x100 relay team. In the 100 metres, he has broken the 10-second barrier multiple times and holds a personal record of 9.84 seconds.

Career
Surin was born in Cap-Haïtien, Haïti, and moved to Québec City with his family in 1975. He made his debut for Canada at the 1987 Pan-American Games, placing fifteenth in the long jump, a result he repeated at the 1988 Olympics.

After the Olympic Games in Seoul in 1988, manager Enrico Dionisi brought Surin to Siena and he was trained by the Italian coach Franco Barucci. Barucci persuaded Surin away from his favoured long jump event, in favour of the 100 m. Barucci predicted he could run 10.10 seconds for the event. Surin won the following Canadian championships in 10.14 seconds.

At the 1990 Commonwealth Games, Surin won a bronze medal in 100 m and was seventh in the long jump. At the 1991 World Championships, Surin was eighth in the 100 m, and at the 1992 Summer Olympics he was 4th in the 100m and reached the semifinals as a member of Canadian 4 × 100 m relay team.

At the 1993 World Championships, Surin was fifth in 100 m and won a bronze medal as a member of Canadian 4 × 100 m relay team. At the 1994 Commonwealth Games, Surin won the gold medal in 4 × 100 m relay and was eliminated in the semifinal of 100 m.  Competing for the province of Quebec, Surin edged out Donovan Bailey to win gold in the 100 m at the 1994 Francophone Games in Paris with a games record time of 10.08 seconds.  At the 1995 World Championships, Surin won a silver medal in 100 m, behind compatriot Bailey, and a gold medal as a member of Canadian 4 × 100 m relay team.

At the Atlanta Olympics, the Canadian relay team were not favoured, although they had won almost all of the titles available during the previous two years, but they had done it in absence of the United States team. However, in the 4 × 100 m relay final, the Canadian team beat United States by almost half a second, establishing itself the best relay team in the world. Surin also reached the semifinal of 100 m in the same competition.

Surin and the Canadian team won a gold medal again at the 1997 World Championships and a silver medal at the 1998 Goodwill Games. He was also seventh in 100 m at the 1997 World Championships and won a silver medal in 100 m at the 1999 World Championships.  His time matched Donovan Bailey's Canadian record of 9.84. At the time, this was the fastest losing time in a 100 m race.

At the 2000 Summer Olympics, Surin, one of the gold medal favorites, had not fully recovered from a leg injury sustained at the Canadian championships earlier that summer, and was eliminated in the semifinals of the 100m after slowing down visibly in pain and walking the rest of the way through the finish line.  His last major championship race was in the semifinals of the 100 m at the 2001 World Championships, where he injured himself again and was pushed off the track in a wheelchair.

In 2009, Surin became the new Canadian 50 metres record holder (40-45 age group) with a time of 6.15s at the McGill Open.

In May 2022, Surin was named Team Canada's chef de mission for the 2024 Olympics in Paris.

Honours
In 2016, he was made a Knight of the National Order of Quebec.

Book: Bruny Surin, le lion tranquille

In 2009, a biography cowritten by Bruny Surin and Saïd Khalil entitled Bruny Surin, le lion tranquille was published by Éditions Libre Expression in Montreal. The book covers Bruny Surin recounting 17 years of his sports career. In the book, Surin criticizes doping, describing it as a gangrene that ails athletics and all other sports.

Surin emigrated to Canada with his family in 1975. His father lost his family in the 2010 Haiti earthquake. He has two daughters. Surin ran for a seat on Laval City Council in a by-election on November 24, 2019, but lost by 82 votes.

See also
 Canadian records in track and field

References

External links

Official website

1967 births
Living people
People from Cap-Haïtien
Athletes from Montreal
Canadian sportsperson-politicians
Canadian male sprinters
Canadian male long jumpers
Olympic male sprinters
Olympic male long jumpers
Olympic track and field athletes of Canada
Olympic gold medalists for Canada
Olympic gold medalists in athletics (track and field)
Athletes (track and field) at the 1988 Summer Olympics
Athletes (track and field) at the 1992 Summer Olympics
Athletes (track and field) at the 1996 Summer Olympics
Athletes (track and field) at the 2000 Summer Olympics
Medalists at the 1996 Summer Olympics
Commonwealth Games gold medallists for Canada
Commonwealth Games bronze medallists for Canada
Commonwealth Games medallists in athletics
Athletes (track and field) at the 1990 Commonwealth Games
Athletes (track and field) at the 1994 Commonwealth Games
Athletes (track and field) at the 2002 Commonwealth Games
Pan American Games track and field athletes for Canada
Athletes (track and field) at the 1987 Pan American Games
Goodwill Games medalists in athletics
Competitors at the 1998 Goodwill Games
World Athletics Championships athletes for Canada
World Athletics Championships winners
World Athletics Championships medalists
World Athletics Indoor Championships winners
Japan Championships in Athletics winners
Knights of the National Order of Quebec
Haitian Quebecers
Black Canadian track and field athletes
Haitian emigrants to Canada
Naturalized citizens of Canada
Members of the Order of Canada
Medallists at the 1990 Commonwealth Games
Medallists at the 1994 Commonwealth Games